The 2021 season for  was the 13th season in the team's existence, the third as a UCI ProTeam, and the second under the current name.

As the best performing UCI ProTeam in the 2020 season,  were guaranteed invitations to all events in the 2021 UCI World Tour. The team finished the season once again as the best UCI ProTeam, ensuring UCI World Tour invitations in 2022.

Team roster 

Riders who joined the team for the 2021 season

Riders who left the team during or after the 2020 season

Season victories

National, Continental, and World Champions

Notes

References

External links 

 

2021 road cycling season by team
2021
2021 in Belgian sport